Francesco Todaro (14 February 1839 – 22 October 1918) was an Italian anatomist born in Tripi, a village in the province of Messina.

He taught classes in anatomy as Professor at the Universities of Messina and Rome.

In his anatomical studies on the structure of the heart, he described a fibrous extension of the Eustachian valve, now referred to as the "tendon of Todaro". In the field of zoology, he conducted extensive studies on a variety of tunicates known as salps.

In 1874 he became a member of the "Nazionale dei Lincei".

Written works 
 Sopra la struttura delle orecchiette del cuore umano (1865) - On the structure of the auricles of the human heart.
 Lo sviluppo e l'anatomia delle Salpe (1885) - The development and anatomy of salps.

References 
 Encyclopedia Treccani.it (biography)

1839 births
1918 deaths
Physicians from Sicily
Members of the Senate of the Kingdom of Italy
Italian anatomists
Academic staff of the Sapienza University of Rome
Academic staff of the University of Messina